National road 81 is a route belonging to the Polish national road network. The highway connects Katowice with Skoczów, the whole stretch lies within Silesian Voivodeship.

In 1985 the numbering system was re-organised. The road from Katowice to Skoczów was since 1986 named Droga krajowa Nr. 93. It was renamed to DK 81 in 2003.

References 

81